The Kerr–Addison Mine (also known as the Kerr Mine) is an abandoned gold mine in the Kearns area of McGarry, Ontario.

Gold ore was initially discovered at the mine's location around 1900, although production was low until 1936, then increasing through to 1960 and stopping in 1963. In the 1960s the mine was the largest gold producing gold mine in Canada.

The increase in global gold prices caused the mine to reopen from 1990 until 1996, by which time over 12 million ounces had been produced.

Ownership of the mine changed several times with surface and mining rights not always staying with the same corporation, until 2021, at which point Gold Candle Limited took ownership of both.

Location and geology 

The mine is located on the north east edge of Larder Lake, in the Timiskaming District of Ontario, Canada.

The mine is on basalt volcanic rock.

History

Gold discovery 

In the very late 19th century, Ignace Tonené, chief of the Teme-Augama Anishnabai community, discovered gold ore on the side of Larder Lake. Although Tonené properly registered his staking claims, the registration was not respected, and European settlers "jumped" his claim, registering it again in their name. At that time, the Indian Act of 1876 prevented Indigenous people from hiring lawyers.

In 1904, H. L. Kerr examined the area north of Larder Lake and concluded he should revisit it for further investigation. Kerr was a 1903 graduate of the University of Toronto who had spent one week of geological mapping as an assistant at the Geological Survey of Canada. Kerr shared his analysis with William Addison, who visited the area in 1906 and discovered Dr Reddick of Ottawa already surveying it.

Kerr and Addison registered their claim in 1906, Dr Reddick of Ottawa registered a claim for the adjoining property, and the Ottawa-based Chesterville-Larder Lake Gold Mining Company Ltd registered the Hummel-Kearns claim in 1906 or 1907. Kerr-Addison Gold Mines was formed.

Start of mining 

Ownership of the mine passed between three companies, the third being Associated Goldfields Limited, who bought both the Kerr-Addison mine, and the adjacent Reddick mine, in 1917. The company became Canadian Associated Goldfields in 1921 before going bankrupt in 1928. Proprietary Mines Limited was then formed and took over the mines, and an additional nearby sixteen claims.

Between 1920 and 1921, Proprietary Mines Limited sunk a 91-metre shaft and developed levels at 175 and 300 feet depth. The lower level cross-cut missed the ore body by about 6 metres, and although more drilling did later reach the ore body, the mine was abandoned in 1923.

Kerr-Addison Mines was incorporated in 1936, out of a merger of Kerr-Addison Gold Mines, Anglo-Huronian, Bouzan Mines and Prospector Airways and purchased 26 full and 2 fractional claims in 1937. The company drove four adits to explore mineral veins into a hill on the west of the property where they found low grades of gold. Diamond drilling from within the #1 adit was successful and returned ore with 10.5 grams per ton of gold for over 33 metres. More drilling followed, as did the construction of a $1.75 million 450-tonnes-per-day processing mill. Ore processing started on May 2 1938 and the first bar of gold was poured on June 11, 1938. The mill as upgraded to be able to process 1,090 tons per day in 1939, and after significantly more gold was discovered at 1,000 feet depth in 1940, the mill was further upgraded to 1,725 tons per day in 1941. By 1958, shaft #3 was lowered to 1,174 metres, and #4 was lowered to 1,829 metres (6,000 feet) in 1959.

World War II decreased production to 1,000 tons per day, but it rose in 1948 to processing over 3,630 tons per day, which was maintained until 1961. The most successful year was 1960 in which 18,400 kilograms of gold were produced from 1,512,860 tons of ore, making the mine the top producer in North America. Ore reserves dwindled in 1960 and all further exploration was abandoned in 1963, with the focus of the work shifting to removing ore was already identified.

The mine employed 2,500 people at its peak.

1990s ownership changes and resumption of mining 

Gold prices became deregulated and rose from $35 per ounce in 1971 to $800 per ounce in 1980. In 1987, owners Kerr-Addison Ltd  sold the mine for $38 million to Golden Shield Resources Ltd, who started an ambitious exploration program. Shortly after, the global gold price sharply dropped, forcing Golden Shield into bankruptcy in 1989.

Golden Shield's assets were purchased by GSR Mining Corporation a subsidiary of Deak Resources Corporation of Toronto. Golden Shield/Deak restarted mining operations in 1990 with $2 million financial support from the Ontario Heritage Fund, which continued until 1996. GSR and Deak, who retained 50% of the surface rights, merged with A J Perron and collectively dissolved on April 10, 2000.

In 2010, Armistice Resources Corporation, who already owned the neighboring McGarry Mine, bought the Kerr-Addison Mine, and in 2011 announced plans to drill more.  

The Ontario Government instructed Armistice Resources to decommission the site, but they refused and took their disagreement to an environmental and land tribunal in 2013. They argued that they did not need to submit a mine closure plan as they were not the surface owner, as defined in the Mining Act. In 2018, the Mining and Lands Commissioner found in Armistice's favour the dismissed the previous governmental demands.

Armistice Resources changed their name to Kerr Mines Inc in 2014 and changed their Toronto Stock Exchange symbol to TSX:KER. In 2014, Kerr Mines sold the Kerr-Addison Mine, the adjoining McGarry Mine and associated mining claims, to Golden Candle Limited for $11 million. Kerr Mines later became Arizona Gold.

In 2016, Michael Berns, the owner of Gold Candle Ltd submitted an affidavit to court stating that dissolved owners of the surface rights (GSR, Deak and A J Perron) had failed to remediating the site. As part of that court process, court-appointed receivers took rights over the surface rights mine and sold it to Gold Candle Ltd. As of 2021, Gold Candle Ltd owns 100% of the mine.

In total, between 1938 and 1996 it produced more than 12 million ounces of gold.

Unionisation 
The Kerr-Addison Employees’s Association union was formed in 1943. It became affiliated with the Canadian National Federation of Independent Union in 1981 and in 1989 merged with United Steelworkers of America to become USWA Local 9283.

See also 

 Abitibi gold belt
 Beanland Mine
 Cobalt: Cradle of the Demon Metals, Birth of a Mining Superpower

References

External links 

 Photos at VtownHistory.org 

Underground mines in Canada
Former mines in Ontario
Gold mines in Canada
Mining communities in Ontario